The Olofin Adimula Oodua of Ado-Odo is the Traditional Ruler and Yoruba king of Ado-Odo; he is also referred to as the Oba of Ado. Ado-Odo is the metropolitan headquarters of the Ado Kingdom in Ogun State, Southwestern Nigeria.

The Oba of Ado is a permanent member of the Ogun State Council of Obas and presently ranks next in rank to the Paramount Ruler in Yewa Traditional Council. The Olofin Adimula Oodua equally enjoys special first-class status culminating in the front row seating arrangement he enjoys next to the current four Paramount Rulers in the Ogun State Council of Obas and the Chairman of Ado-Odo/Ota Traditional Council or Obas Council.

The stool is presently vacant after the demise of His Imperial Majesty, Late Oba Abdul-Lateef Adeniran Akanni Ojikutujoye I who joined his ancestors on 7 January 2022. He reigned from 2 May 2009 till his death.

The Oba of Ado during the reign of Oba Ogabi Akapo served as the Vice President Western House of Chiefs and later Permanent Chairman, Ogun State Council of Obas for Egbado Traditional Council following the creation of Ogun state in 1976 and held the office for years until his demise in 1989.

Ruling Houses 
Following the approved Chieftaincy Declaration according to the Western Regional Government official gazette in the 1950s, the four (4) Ruling Houses that are entitled to the throne are as follows;
House of Idose 
House of Idobarun  ( The Ruling House that produced the reigning Olofin).
House of Okewaye
House of Igboro

These are families who are entitled to the ancestral stool of the Olofin Adimula Oodua of Ado-odo Kingdom. The Kingmakers, after due consultation, appoint who is next in succession to the mantle of leadership as an oba in this ancient and the foremost Awori Kingdom. The first Olofin Adimula Oodua was installed in 1050, which was about five years after the Town was founded.

History 
Oba Asade Awope, Olofin Otenibotemole had the singular honour of reigning over Ado and Erekiti kingdoms which was a rare feat in pre-colonial time. His successful defense at the Lagos legislative house after the harassment by the British for unsubstantiated allegations qualified him as a hero of early Nigerian nationalism. In the Gazette No. 9 of 1903 enacted on 28 February 1903, Oba of Ado was listed as one of the twenty-two beaded crowns of Yoruba land (first gazette).

In 1863, Oba Adebami Agbojojoye signed a Treaty annexing Ado Kingdom to the British Empire. In the Berlin Conference of 1884 to 1885, Ado Kingdom was a major issue during the scramble and partition of Africa between the British, Germans, Italians, and the French.

The annual conference of chiefs of western provinces was introduced in 1937, Oba Adeteru Iso, Olofin Arolagbade attended the conference held in Ijebu-Ode in 1941 with the Alake of Egbaland to represent Abeokuta province.

Excerpts of the colonial report of 1940s has it that "it is doubtful whether there is in all Ilaro division, a true Oba who received his crown from Ife. Ado appears to have always had a head and he was known as an Oba before the advent of British rule." The Obaship institution in Ado has its root from Ife.

Additionally, Oba Jacob Ogabi Adebowale Fadeyi Akapo, Olofin Agunloye was a member and Vice President of the Western Region House of Chiefs from 1956 to 1966. Following the military takeover in January, 1966, (1966 Nigerian coup d'etat) all political activities were suspended. This left all local government affairs in the hands of traditional rulers with Oba Akapo being the arrowhead for Ado-Odo/Igbesa district council and the defunct Ilaro division of Western State.

Ado-Odo Kingmakers 
Principally, four groups constitute the core indigenous people of Ado presently identified as the Awori indigenes of Ado-Odo. They occupy the two components of Osì and Ogona, which were sub-divided to the four quarters of Oke-Osi, Odo-Osi, Odojana, and Okejana. These quarters form the basis of cultural interaction, land ownership, and the Chieftaincy institution in Ado Kingdom.

Following the approved Chieftaincy Declaration according to the Western Regional Government official gazette in the 1950s, the kingmakers and members of Oba-in-Council for Ado-Odo are the following:

Chief Osolo of Ado
Chief Ira of Ado
Chief Bajomu of Ado
Chief Aro of Ado
Chief Oga-Ilu Odo-Ijana, Ado (Head of Oga Ilus)
Chief Oga-Ilu Oke-Osi, Ado
Chief Oga-Ilu Oke-Ijana, Ado
Chief Oga-Ilu Odo-Osi, Ado

Each of these Quarters constitutes the traditional chiefs, who are kingmakers and assigned to perform specific roles in the Town. Bajomu, Osolo, Ira, Aro are the head of fore core indigenous Awori Quarters and also the custodians of the shrines in their quarters. These four kingmakers are traditionally empowered to elect the king (Oba) for the Town.

List Of Past And Modern-Day Obas 
 	Oba Olofin Asalu Iranje Ojeje
 	Oba Olofin Erin
 	Oba Olofin Ojiganlori Oye
 	Oba Iranje (First Son of Asalu Ojeje)
   Oba Olofin Atepojoye
 	Olofin Asagbejoye
 	Oba Atuyagba Lori Ade
 	Oba Elumu Liwaye
 	Oba Serere Gbele Kekere Jojolo
 	Oba Obanla
 	Oba Etigbejibojoye
 	Oba Obalumu Kuseku Olimegu
 	Oba Asoesi Lipeti
 	Oba Bewaji Amororolagbo
 	Oba Ọṣọja Abosajoye (1379–1402)
 	Oba Adetogu Atuyangba (1403–1430)
 	Oba Adeluyi Oyigudujoye (1432–1461)
 	Oba Asade Atepawoga (1461) He died at Ipebi.
 	Oba Agbogunjoye (1462–1493)
 	Oba Iroke (1495–1530)
 	Oba Afogbinjoye (1531–1549)
 	Oba Ero Gbewara (1550–1584)
 	Oba Osangandewu (Osan Egan Diyewu) (1585–1610
 	Oba Asunsun joye (1611–1636)
 	Oba Aponlese (1637–1658)
 	Oba Aregiopejoye (1658–1660
 	Oba Ipokin (1660–1679)
 	Oba Megbowoye (1680–1731)
 	Oba Ododo (1733–1770)
 	Oba Emiro (Emuro) (1771–1811
 	Oba Aike I (Akesile) (1812–1857)
 	Oba Adebami Dokunmu (Agbojojoye) (1858–1870)
 	Oba Adeto Erigberejoye (1871–1882)
 	Oba Asade Awope (Otenibotemole) (1884–1913)
 	Oba Adeteru Iso (Arolagbade) (1913–1915)
 	Oba Alesinloye Bankole (Amilujigijoye) (1915–1925) – deposed
 	Oba Oni Arebi (1925–1932)
 	Oba Adeteru Iso (reinstated) (1932–1952)
 	Oba Jacob Ogabi Fadeyi Akapo (Agunloye) (1953–1989)
 	Oba Abdul-Lateef Adeniran Akanni Ojikutujoye I (Ojikutujoye Obaarun Oladekan 1) (2009–2022)

References

Yoruba history
 
Royal Title
Nigerian traditional rulers
Yoruba royal titles